Ondřej Kovařík is a Czech politician who was elected as a Member of the European Parliament in 2019. He is a former parliamentary assistant to MEP Dita Charanzová. He has since been serving on the Committee on Economic and Monetary Affairs, also called ECON, and the Committee on Civil Liberties, Justice and Home Affairs, aka LIBE. In addition to his committee assignments, he is part of the Parliament's delegation for relations with Canada. He has studied international trade and international affairs and is affiliated to the ANO 2011 movement (Action of Dissatisfied Citizens) set up by Andrej Babiš, former Czech Prime Minister.

References

Living people
People from Kyjov
MEPs for the Czech Republic 2019–2024
ANO 2011 MEPs
ANO 2011 politicians
Prague University of Economics and Business alumni
1980 births